Salmo macedonicus is a species of fish in the family Salmonidae. It is found only in rivers in the upper Vardar river basin in North Macedonia. It is threatened by habitat loss.

The taxonomic status of this fish is controversial.

References

macedonicus
Freshwater fish of Europe
Endemic fauna of North Macedonia
Fish described in 1924
Taxa named by Stanko Karaman
Taxonomy articles created by Polbot